Ninety Mile Beach may refer to:

Beaches
Eighty Mile Beach, Western Australia, formerly called Ninety Mile Beach
Ninety Mile Beach, New Zealand
Ninety Mile Beach, Victoria, in Australia
Ninety Mile Beach Marine National Park, in Victoria, Australia

Other
"Ninety Mile Beach", a song by Wolf Alice from the 2013 EP Blush